Sofia Jeanne Karstens is a Canadian television and film actress who is known for her work in Lovelace, The Greatest Script Ever Written and Bad Blood. Karstens acted on television before moving to more film projects.

Personal life 
On July 16, 2011, Karstens married actor Jason London. They had met through London's brother, Jeremy, who attended the ceremony at the Karstens family home in North Hero, Vermont. After the marriage ceremony, Karstens and London resettled in Los Angeles to resume their acting careers. The ring that London proposed with had been Karstens' grandmother's ring.

Filmography

References

External links 

Living people
Actresses from Montreal
Year of birth missing (living people)
Canadian television actresses
21st-century Canadian actresses
Canadian film actresses